Mej Didi may refer to:

 Mej Didi (1950 film), a 1950 Bengali film
 Mej Didi (2003 film), a 2003 Bengali film